Oleksandra Khomenets is a Ukrainian freestyle wrestler. She is a two-time medalist in the women's 55kg event at the World Wrestling Championships. She is also a silver medalist at the European Wrestling Championships.

Career 

She won one of the bronze medals in the women's 55kg event at the 2021 World Wrestling Championships in Oslo, Norway.

In 2022, she won the silver medal in the women's 55kg event at the European Wrestling Championships held in Budapest, Hungary. She won one of the bronze medals in the women's 57 kg event at the 2022 World Junior Wrestling Championships held in Sofia, Bulgaria. She won the silver medal in the 55kg event at the 2022 World Wrestling Championships held in Belgrade, Serbia. She competed in the 55kg event at the 2022 U23 World Wrestling Championships held in Pontevedra, Spain.

She won the silver medal in her event at the 2023 European U23 Wrestling Championships held in Bucharest, Romania.

Achievements

References

External links 
 

Living people
Ukrainian female sport wrestlers
World Wrestling Championships medalists
Year of birth missing (living people)
European Wrestling Championships medalists
21st-century Ukrainian women